Phantom Music was an independent record label established by Kalenna Harper (former member of Dirty Money) and Tony Vick in 2009, and dissolved in 2011.

References

Defunct record labels of the United States
Record labels established in 2009
Record labels disestablished in 2011